"The Boss" is a 1979 song written and produced by Ashford & Simpson and recorded by American singer Diana Ross, who released it as a single on the Motown label. It was the first release from the album of the same title (1979). The song was released on May 22, 1979, a day before the album release.

Commercial performance
The single peaked at number 19 on the Billboard Hot 100 chart, reached #12 on the Hot Soul Singles chart, and went to number 1 on the Billboard Hot Dance Club Play chart.

The song debuted at number 64 in the UK Singles Chart on July 21, 1979, reaching its highest peak on August 4, 1979. The song spent 7 weeks in the top 75 before leaving the chart on September 1, 1979.

Formats
The track was remixed by David Morales in 1993 and included on Ross' album Diana Extended: The Remixes.
The track was also remixed by Almighty Records in 2009 and was included on their album "Almighty – We Love Diana Ross".  In 2019, a remix by Eric Kupper, entitled "The Boss 2019" went to number one on the Billboard, US Dance Club Songs chart.

Personnel
Lead vocals by Diana Ross
Background vocals by Nickolas Ashford, Valerie Simpson, Maxine and Julia Waters
Produced and written by Ashford & Simpson

Charts

Weekly charts

Year-end charts

The Braxtons version

American R&B group the Braxtons released a cover of "The Boss" in 1997. The song was written by Ashford & Simpson and produced by Kenny "Dope" Gonzalez, "Little" Louie Vega. It was released on March 17, 1997 as the third single from their first studio album, So Many Ways (1996).

Critical reception
In his review of the So Many Ways album, Peter Miro from Cash Box wrote, "Can't say "The Boss" by Diana Ross belongs on the collection, unless it's there to appeal to a techno-oriented dance crowd. Its straight-up hip-hop intro would have made a nice tune if it was fleshed out, but the rest of it sounds incongruous on this otherwise tranquil, luxuriant disc." Jeremy Newall from Music Weeks RM Dance Update praised the track, rating it five out of five. He added, "Live bass, real strings and disco drums capture the lush feeling of the original in breathtaking style."

Commercial performance
On February 1, 1997 the Masters At Work version topped the Billboard Hot Dance Club Play chart for one week a #1 in the United States. The song stayed in the chart for 14 weeks.

On March 29, 1997, the song debuted at number 31 on the UK Singles Chart. The song spent a total of three weeks on the chart at numbers 50 and 69 respectively before leaving the Top 75 on April 12, 1997, becoming their second top 40 in the UK.

Music video
A music video was produced to promote the single, featuring The Braxtons Trina, Towanda and Tamar with a length of the video at 4 minutes and 27 seconds. The video starts with Towanda kissing goodbye her lover as he rushes off to work. Then the video brings you to a living room where Towanda, Trina, and Tamar are singing and dancing.

The video also shows them talking on the phone to each other and also singing by a tree. The plot of the video revolves around Towanda acquiring photos of her husband with another woman, and after he leaves for work, the sisters have a garage sale clearing out the entire house. The video ends with Towanda's husband coming home to an empty house with the pictures left in an envelope on the floor.

Credits
Producer, Mixed By – Kenny "Dope" Gonzalez, "Little" Louie Vega* 
Executive producer – Bryant Reid

Track listings and formats

 US 12" vinyl single"The Boss" (Kenlou Mix) – 9:03
"Only Love" (Radio Mix) – 4:13
"The Boss" (Masters At Work Dub) – 7:15
"The Boss" (MAW Album Mix) – 9:41
"The Boss" (MAW Groove) – 7:33

 US, UK 12" vinyl promo"The Boss" (Kenlou Mix)- 9:03
"The Boss" (Kenlou Radio Mix) – 4:13
"The Boss" (Masters At Work Dub) – 7:15
"The Boss" (Reprise) – 6:12
"The Boss" (MAW Album Mix) – 9:41
"The Boss" (Hip Hop Vocal) – 1:33
"The Boss" (MAW Groove) – 7:33

 US, CD, 12" vinyl maxi-single promo"The Boss" (Radio Edit Of Album) – 3:32
"The Boss" (Spyda Mix With Rap Radio Edit) – 4:21
"The Boss" (Spyda Mix Without Rap Radio Edit) – 4:23
"The Boss" (H.O.P. Quiet Storm Mix Radio Edit) – 4:20

 UK 12" vinyl single"The Boss" (Masters At Work Album Mix) – 9:40
"The Boss" (Reprise) – 6:12
"The Boss" (Kenlou Mix) – 9:03
"The Boss" (Masters At Work Dub) – 7:15

 Europe, Australia CD maxi-single"The Boss" (Kenlou Radio Mix) – 4:13
"The Boss" (Kenlou Mix)- 9:03
"The Boss" (Masters At Work Album Mix) – 9:40
"The Boss" (Masters At Work Dub) – 7:15
"The Boss" (Reprise) – 6:12

 Germany CD single'''
"The Boss" (Kenlou Radio Mix) – 4:13
"The Boss" (Kenlou Mix)- 9:03
"The Boss" (Masters At Work Album Mix) – 9:40

Charts

Release history

Other cover versions
On February 12, 2008, American dance-pop singer Kristine W released a cover of this song as the first single off her album The Power of Music. Kristine's version also hit number one on the Billboard Hot Dance Club Play chart in March 2008, becoming her eleventh US dance chart-topper and the third version of the song to top this survey.

The song was covered by Ashford and Simpson during a televised live concert special in 1982, and by Whitney Houston during her live shows in 1997/98.

Korean pop singer J covered the song on her 2001 special English album Chocolate''.

Louise performed the song on her Heavy Love Tour.

See also
List of number-one dance singles of 1979 (U.S.)

References

1979 songs
1979 singles
1996 songs
1997 singles
2008 singles
Diana Ross songs
Kristine W songs
Songs written by Valerie Simpson
Songs written by Nickolas Ashford
Song recordings produced by Ashford & Simpson